is a Japanese actress and model. Despite her young age, she is widely regarded as one of the most promising Japanese actresses of her generation.

Biography
Hirose debuted as a model for Japanese fashion magazine Seventeen, alongside her sister Alice. She gained fame when she starred with a group of actresses for the award-winning film Our Little Sister. The film won the Picture of the Year award at the 39th Japan Academy Film Prize. Her role for the film garnered her the Newcomer of the Year award in the same ceremony. The film was also selected to compete for the Palme d'Or at the 2015 Cannes Film Festival.
 
In 2017, Hirose appeared in the film  The Third Murder which was a massive success. She won the Best Supporting Actress award in the 41st Japan Academy Film Prize for her role and the film was also awarded the Picture of the Year award in the same ceremony. The film was also screened in the main competition section of the 74th Venice International Film Festival.

She was selected to play the main lead in the live-action trilogy films Chihayafuru, which received box-office successes. She was nominated twice for the Outstanding Performance By An Actress in a Leading Role awards in the Japan Academy Film Prize for her roles in Chihayafuru Part 1 in the 40th Japan Academy Film Prize and Not Quite Dead Yet in the 44th Japan Academy Film Prize.

Hirose played the heroine for the NHK's 100th Asadora, Natsuzora (Summer Sky). She has appeared in multiple commercials since 2013 and regularly tops various polls for celebrities with the most endorsements. Hirose appeared in a number of television dramas such as Kaitō Yamaneko (2016) and Nemesis (2021).

She was nominated for the Best Supporting Actress award in the 45th Japan Academy Film Prize for her role in the film A Morning of Farewell.

Filmography

Film

TV drama

Theatre

TV show
 Muse na Kimito. (BS-TBS, 8 November 2012 – 15 November 2012)
 Mohaya Kami Dane (Fuji TV, 17 April 2013 – 18 September 2013)
69th NHK Kōhaku Uta Gassen (NHK, 31 December 2018), red team host
70th NHK Kōhaku Uta Gassen (NHK, 31 December 2019), a judge

Web drama 
 Aoharu Online Beta (Shueisha)
 "Aoharu Jikan Natsu" (5 July 2013 – 8 August 2013)
 "Suzu to no Aoi Haru" (6 September 2013 – 25 October 2013)
 Kataomoi vol.12 (28 October 2013)
 Jadict "Lovely Hickey #14" (4 November 2013)
 Ghost Band (10 December 2013, Nestle Theater on YouTube)

Radio drama 
 Very Merry Christmas (Tokyo FM, 15 December 2013), Kairi

Radio show 
 School of Lock! - Girls Locks! (Tokyo FM, 14 October 2013 – 16 March 2017)
 Ghana presents - Hirose Suzu no Carnation Letter (Tokyo FM, 6 May 2014)
 Hirose Suzu no All Night Nippon Gold (Nippon Broadcasting System, 20 March 2015)

Music video 
 Tatsuro Yamashita - Christmas Eve (30th Anniversary Edition) (20 November 2013)
 Atsushi - Precious Love (29 October 2014)
 Naoto Inti Raymi -  Itsuka Kitto (8 April 2015)
 Kobukuro - Hana (20 April 2015)
Whiteeeen - Tetote with GReeeeN (2 May 2017)
Spitz - Uta Usagi (3 October 2017) 
Ruriiro No Chikyū (cover) (1 June 2019)

Bibliography

Magazine
 Seventeen, Shueisha 1967-, as an exclusive model (October 2012 – November 2018)
 B.L.T., Tokyo News Service 1997-, "Zenzen, Hajimetedesu" (June 2014 – May 2016)
 CM Now, Genkosha 1931-, "Arisuzu" (July/August 2014 – July/August 2017)
 Grand Jump, Shueisha 1967-, "1 piece" (21 January 2015 – 1 April 2015)
Nikkei Entertainment!, Nikkei BP 1997-, "Makezugirai" (April 2017 – July 2018)

Photobook
 Hirose Suzu 1st Photobook "Suzu" (31 March 2014), Tokyo News Service, 
 17-sai no Suzubon (19 March 2016), Shueisha, 
Suzu Hirose in Natsuzora Photobook (1 April 2019), Tokyo News Service, 
Leisure Treasure (19 February 2022), Kodansha,

Book cover 

 Suitei Osananajimi Part 1 (24 May 2013)
 Suitei Osananajimi Part 2 (25 June 2013)

Discography

Audio 
 Hatsukoi / Kazemachi de Aimasho (24 June 2015)
 Rōei Ogura Hyakunin Isshu (6 April 2016)
 Ruriiro no Chikyuu / Fireworks OST (9 August 2017)

Record jacket 
 Ai no Uta Bitter Sweet Tracks 2 → mixed by Q;indivi+ / Ai no Uta J-POP NON STOP MIX 2 → mixed by DJ FUMI★YEAH! (24 December 2014)
 back number - "Heroine" (21 January 2015)
 Naoto Inti Raymi -  Itsuka Kitto (8 April 2015)

Advertisements

TV commercial 
 Benesse Corporation - Shinken Seminar Kōkō Kōza (2012 - 2013)
 Nippon Telegraph and Telephone East Corporation - FLET'S Hikari Ninen Wari (2013)
 Otsuka Foods - Match/Match Pink (2014)
 Lotte
 Ghana (2014 - 2015)
 Koume (2014)
 Fit's (2015 - 2016)
Sō (2017 - 2021)
 Recruit Marketing Partners
Zexy (2014 - 2015) - 7th Commercial Girl
Rikunabi Next (2021)
 SoftBank
SoftBank Mobile - Shirato Family (2014 - 2021)
SoftBank Robotics - Whiz (2020)
Softbank 5G (2021) 
 Line Corporation - LINE PLAY (2014)
 Shizuoka Ichigo Kyōgikai - Shizuoka Strawberry "Benihoppe" (2014)
 JR East - JR SkiSki (2014 - 2015)
 Myojo Foods
Ippeichan Yomise no Yakisoba (2015 - 2016)
Charumera (2017)
 Tokyo Gas
Ene Farm (2015)
Anata to Zutto Kyo yori Motto (2015)
Barber Suga (2016)
 Shiseido
Sea Breeze (2015)
D Program (2020)
150th Anniversary Commercial (2022) 
 Katakura Industries - Cocoon City (2015)
 Fujifilm
Shaprise Shiyou (2015)
Fuji Color
Oshogatsu wo Utsuso (2015 - 2021)
Mashikaku Print (2017)
Instax mini (2018)
Instax mini Evo (2021) 
 Senju Pharmaceutical - Mytear CL (2015 - 2020)
Nippon Professional Baseball Organization (2015)
 Universal Studios Japan
Universal Surprise Halloween (2015)
The Wizarding World of Harry Potter (2016)
 Leopalace21 (2015 - 2016)
Mitsubishi UFJ NICOS - DC Card (2016 - 2018)
GlaxoSmithKline Consumer Healthcare Japan - Contac (2016 - 2020)
Square Enix - Final Fantasy Brave Exvius (2016 - 2017)
Suzuki - Suzuki Wagon R (2017 - 2019)
Stripe International - Earth Music&Ecology (2017 - 2020)
Otsuka Pharmaceutical - Five Mini (2017)
Tokyo Organising Committee of the Olympic and Paralympic Games - Recruit Volunteers (2018)
Japanese Red Cross Society - Blood Donation at Twenty (2018)
The Pokémon Company - Pokémon Trading Card Game (2018)
Toshiba Lifestyle (2018 - 2019)
Asahi Soft Drinks
Mitsuya Cider (2019)
Mitsuya Lemonade (2019)
Plant Time Soy Milk Tea (2020)
Ministry of Agriculture, Forestry and Fisheries - #Genkini Itadakimasu Project (2020)
AGC (2021)
Ajinomoto Frozen Food - Gyoza★ (2021)
Mitsui Fudosan - Be The Change (2021)
Air Jordan (Japan) Tokyo Fearless Ones (2021)

Ambassador
 Haruta Inc. - Haruta Image Girl (2013)
 Japan Fire and Crisis Management Association - Zenkoku Kasai Yobō Undō (2014-2015)
 93rd All Japan High School Soccer Tournament - 10th Cheergirl (2014)
Cocoon City - First Image Character (2015 - 2016)
 Japan Industrial Safety & Health Association - National Safety Week, Heat Stroke Prevention (2015)
Japan International Cooperation Agency - Nantokashinakya! Project (2015)
 Ministry of Internal Affairs and Communications - Voting at 18 Years Old Image Character (2015)
Kimono Yamato - Image Character (2015)
B.League - Special Booster (2016)
Crocs Japan - Global Ambassador (2019)
Louis Vuitton - Ambassador (2020)
Air Jordan (Japan) - Face of the Brand (2021)

Exhibitions 

 Pure Actress - photo exhibition of 50 Japanese actresses
 Hong Kong (2016)
 Shanghai (2017)
 Macau - Art Macau 2019 (10 - 29 August 2019)
 Tokyo Omotesandō (14 July - 8 August 2021)
 Oh My Sister! - photo exhibition of Hirose sisters
 Tokyo Ginza (1 - 10 March 2019)
 Osaka Umeda (28 December 2019 - 26 January 2020)

Awards

References

External links
  
   
  
 

Living people
1998 births
Japanese film actresses
Japanese television actresses
Japanese voice actresses
Japanese female models
21st-century Japanese actresses
Asadora lead actors
People from Shizuoka (city)